This is a list of Ottoman Navy steamships lost during Italo-Ottoman War, Balkan Wars and World War I:

Italo-Ottoman War

Balkan Wars

First World War

Sources 

Naval ships of the Ottoman Empire
Lists of ships of the Ottoman Empire
Ottoman